The Raymond E. Baldwin Bridge is a concrete segmental bridge composed of eleven spans crossing the Connecticut River between Old Saybrook, Connecticut and Old Lyme, Connecticut. The bridge carries Interstate 95 and U.S. Route 1, with an average daily traffic of 82,500 vehicles.

The bridge carries eight lanes of Interstate 95 and US 1 traffic, 4 in each direction.  In addition, there is a bike/pedestrian walkway on the north side of the bridge adjacent to the southbound lanes.

History 

There have been three bridges on this site. Prior to the construction of the first bridge here, a ferry was used for the crossing, with the ferry landing located farther downstream.

The first bridge was a double-bascule span completed in 1911. This held up traffic terribly on weekends when boat traffic was heavy.

The second bridge opened in 1948 with a 4-lane girder and floorbeam bridge. The bridge collected tolls until their removal in the late 1980s. This bridge was demolished in 1994 after its replacement opened.

The third and current bridge was built by O&G Industries, Inc. out of Torrington, CT. Construction of the bridge began in 1990 and was completed in 1993 with a total cost of $460 million.

The bridge is named after former Connecticut Governor Raymond E. Baldwin, who was governor from 1939 to 1941 and again from 1943 to 1946.

See also 
List of crossings of the Connecticut River

References

External links 

 (1993)
 (1948)

Old Lyme, Connecticut
Old Saybrook, Connecticut
Bridges over the Connecticut River
U.S. Route 1
Interstate 95
Bridges in Middlesex County, Connecticut
Bridges in New London County, Connecticut
Road bridges in Connecticut
Bridges on the Interstate Highway System
Bridges of the United States Numbered Highway System
Former toll bridges in Connecticut
Concrete bridges in the United States
Box girder bridges in the United States